Mary Griffith may refer to:

 Mary Griffith (writer) (1772–1846), American writer, horticulturist and scientist
 Mary Griffith (activist) (1934–2020), American LGBT rights activist
 Mary Harriett Griffith (1849–1930), philanthropist in Brisbane, Queensland, Australia
 Mary Lavinia Griffith (1906–1993), American rancher and conservationist